Volta Mantovana is a comune (municipality) in the Province of Mantua in the Italian region Lombardy, located about  east of Milan and about  northwest of Mantua.

Volta Mantovana borders the following municipalities: Cavriana, Goito, Marmirolo, Monzambano, Valeggio sul Mincio.

Etimology

In Italian the word  means 'a turn' or 'a bend', and it is supposed that the name of Volta Mantovana comes from either a bend in the river Mincio, or a turn in the road running alongside between Mantua and Goito to the south and Monzambano and Peschiera to the north.

History

Neolithic period

The area of Volta Mantovana has a long history of human occupation.

The discovery of the site, located in the  Isolone del Mincio (sometimes known as isolane Delle Moradelle o Prevalese) constituted one of the most notable bronze-age archeological discoveries from the Bronze Age in the Upper Mantuan area, and helped prompt more research in the hitherto neglected history of the Bronze Age in the area between the river Mincio, the river Po and lake Garda. Local historian Cesare Farinelli estimated in his History of Valeggio that around 16,000 archeological remains (mostly ceramic shards and lithics) were recovered. While the site at Isolone del Mincio was unfortunately destroyed by later construction work, later excavations at Bande di Cavriana and Castellaro Lagusello in Monzambano have led to the recovery of two similar Bronze Age sites associated with the local bronze-age material culture known as Polada culture and their preservation as archeological sites.

Antiquity

An Iron-Age tomb excavated in the municipality of Volta has sometimes been referred to as the northernmost find of definitive Etruscan remains. A small number of Roman finds (connected with burials and a possible necropolis) are in the collections of the nearby archeological museum at Cavriana.

Middle Ages

In the Middle Ages Volta came to notable for the castle which still dominates the small town. Its exact date of construction is unknown. Historian Giovanni Paccagnini thought it was built in the 8th century, and historian Piero Gazzola instead proposed a date in the 9th century. It was certainly in existence in 1053 when Countess Beatrice of Lorraine, wife of Boniface III of Tuscany and holder of comital rights over the Imperial county of Mantua (and the greater part of the Po valley) donated her seigneurial estate, castle and chapel at Volta to the bishop of Mantua, a donation which another edict seemingly confirmed in 1073. Beatrice's daughter Matilda of Tuscany still maintained extensive possessions in Volta because she made a donation of rights over the labor of the serfs of Volta to the canons of the Church of Saint Peter in Mantua in 1079.

During the investiture controversy a key battle known as the Battle of Volta Mantovana took place in or near the town, most likely in October 1080. As related in the Chronicon of Bernold of Constance (who mentions the battle as taking place "") and in the Liber ad Amicum of Bonizo of Sutri an army of Lombard forces loyal to the emperor Henry IV defeated the troops of Matilda of Tuscany in front or near the castle. Matilda's defeat was consequential, and made it possible for Henry IV to enter the March of Verona unopposed, marching down the Brenner pass in March and reaching Verona for Easter, on 4 April 1081, before entering Milan and receiving the homage of the Lombard cities ten days later.

Renaissance and Early Modern Period

During the Renaissance, after the Republic of Venice ceded the town and castle to the House of Gonzaga Ludovico III Gonzaga built a palace in the town, to which a large park was added in the 16th century. In the course of the 17th century two ecclesiastical foundations of note were established in town: a Franciscan convent outside town, and an Ursuline nunnery within the town walls. In 1708, with the dissolution of the Duchy of Mantua Volta Mantovana became a part of Austrian Lombardy.

Risorgimento and Liberal Italy

Following the Piedmontese defeat in the 1848 battle of Custoza the retreating Piedmontese crossed the Mincio to reconnect with the Piedmontese forces then besieging Mantua and to concentrate at Goito. On the morning of 26 July, during the course of the retreat, the third Piedmontese division of general Ettore De Sonnaz was ordered to occupy Volta Mantovana (just recently abandoned) and to either cover the Piedmontese retreat or frustrate the Austrian advance. In the ensuing Battle of Volta Mantovana the Austrians frustrated the Piedmontese attempt to recapture the town and repulsed the Piedmontese counter-attack, forcing the Piedmontese to retreat towards a new defensive line behind the river Oglio.

Volta Mantovana was the home and native place of the radical Italian politician Ivanoe Bonomi, who was born into one of the town's more affluent landholding families and quickly became the most prominent political figure in early 20th century Mantua (invariably running for a seat in the Mantuan  from Volta). Bonomi, a reformist socialist broke with the mainstream Italian Socialist movement in the early 1900s when he became a prominent advocate of Italian colonialism and of the Italian participation in the First World War, emerging as the most influential national spokesperson for the movement known as "democratic interventionism", a position that influenced even Benito Mussolini. His ambiguous or indecisive attitude towards Fascism as Home Secretary in the Giolitti government and then, in 1921, as prime minister is often cited as one of the primary reasons behind Fascism's successful seizure of power, though Bonomi was by no means a Fascist and never joined the Fascist party. After Mussolini's seizure of power, Bonomi withdrew from politics, emerging in the 1940s, as an anti-fascist figure of note and helping organize the 25 July 1943 coup. After the war Bonomi became the first president of the Italian Senate. He was buried in the cemetery of Volta Mantovana following his death in 1951.

Fascism

During the disturbances that preceded the Fascist seizure of power Volta Mantovana was briefly occupied by Fascist Militias. On 4 June 1921 in a brawl a local named Ardiccio Magri purportedly wounded two Fascist activists, Ettore Morganti and Vittorio Ferrari. The provincial committee of the Fascist Party of Mantua immediately accused the local leadership of the Catholic Italian People's Party and local parish priest Don Cesare Ferrari of having conspired against the Fascists by inciting violence and resolved to retaliate, dispatching all local squadristi to Volta. After five days of uninterrupted street violence and intimidation the local municipal government of the Italian People's Party resigned to be replaced by a commissar, while parish priest Don Cesare Ferarri was withdrawn from the parish.

Main sights
Palazzo Gonzaga-Guerrieri (15th century), built by Louis III of Mantua. In 1515 his heirs donated it to Ludovico Guerrieri, the local commissar of the House of Gonzaga. It returned to a cadet branch of the Gonzaga in 1860; now it houses the town hall.
Castle (erected at the lasted during 11th century), and connected with the struggle between Matilda of Tuscany and Henry IV.  The castle was briefly occupied by a Venetian garrison before being turned over to the Gonzaga Marquis of Mantova in 1450.
Parish church

References

External links
 Official website

Cities and towns in Lombardy